The 2009–10 Western Carolina Catamounts men's basketball team represented Western Carolina University during the 2009–10 college basketball season. This was head coach Larry Hunter's fifth season at Western Carolina. The Catamounts competed in the Southern Conference and played their home games at the Ramsey Center. They finished the season 22–12, 11–7 in SoCon play, lost in the semifinals of the 2010 Southern Conference men's basketball tournament and were invited to the 2010 CollegeInsider.com Tournament where they lost in the first round to Marshall.

Roster
Source

Schedule and results
Source
All times are Eastern

|-
!colspan=9| Regular Season

|-
!colspan=9| 2010 Southern Conference men's basketball tournament

|-
!colspan=10| 2010 CollegeInsider.com Tournament

References

Western Carolina
Western Carolina Catamounts men's basketball seasons
Western Carolina
Western Carolina Catamounts men's basketball
Western Carolina Catamounts men's basketball